Bira Kesari Deo (1 January 1927 – 3 September 2012) was an Indian politician from the State of Orissa. He was member of Orissa Legislative Assembly during 1957–1967.

Later he represent State of Orissa in Rajya Sabha during 1967–1970 and 1970–1976. He was from Bhawanipatna, Kalahandi.

He had 4 sons and 2 daughter.

References

1927 births
2012 deaths
Members of the Odisha Legislative Assembly
Rajya Sabha members from Odisha
People from Bhawanipatna